Trish Best, known by her stage name Feloni, is an American rapper from Detroit, Michigan. Her coming out as lesbian was featured on MTV's LOGO documentary show Coming Out Stories.

Honors
 Winner of Broadjam's February 2007 Rap Lyric Contest
 Nominated for Best Rapper of 2007 by the Los Angeles Music Awards

Discography
 A Woman's Revenge (2007) Feloni's Debut Album.
 Girl Thing feat Feloni (2008) Collaboration with Lori Michaels on Album Living My Life Out Loud.
 I Ain't Scared of U (2010) I Ain't Scared of U Single.
 Ode to D.B. feat Riot Baby(2017) Ode to D.B. Single.
 Blame It on Nothin'(Remastered) (2019) Single.
 Pussi Can (Short Version) (2019)

References

External links
 Feloni on LogoTV
  
 
 Out Artists on the Rise, Interview with Feloni, GO Magazine, 2008

Living people
American women rappers
African-American rappers
Rappers from Detroit
Midwest hip hop musicians
African-American women singer-songwriters
LGBT rappers
Lesbian singers
Lesbian songwriters
American lesbian musicians
LGBT African Americans
American LGBT singers
American LGBT songwriters
LGBT people from Michigan
Year of birth missing (living people)
21st-century American rappers
21st-century American women musicians
20th-century American LGBT people
21st-century American LGBT people
21st-century African-American women
21st-century African-American musicians
Singer-songwriters from Michigan
21st-century women rappers
American lesbian writers